Fealy is a surname. Notable people with the surname include:

Barbara Fealy (1903–2000), American landscape architect
Maude Fealy (1883–1971), American actress

See also
Feely